John Paul Sparrow (born 3 June 1957) is an English former professional footballer who played as a left-back.

Club career
Born in Bethnal Green, Sparrow started his career with Senrab, before moving to Chelsea and signing professionally in 1974. He made his debut at the age of sixteen, in a 3–0 win over Burnley. Unable to ever tie down a first-team position, he was loaned to Millwall in 1979, and eventually sold to Exeter City in 1981 for £10,000. After two years with Exeter City, he moved to Sutton United.

Following his retirement, Sparrow went on to run The Oxford Arms in Hanworth Middlesex

Personal life
He was the older brother of fellow professional footballer Brian Sparrow.

References

1957 births
Living people
Footballers from Bethnal Green
Footballers from Greater London
English footballers
England youth international footballers
Association football defenders
Chelsea F.C. players
Millwall F.C. players
Exeter City F.C. players
Sutton United F.C. players
Senrab F.C. players